The 1981 Crispa Redmanizers season was the seventh season of the franchise in the Philippine Basketball Association (PBA).

Colors
Crispa Redmanizers (Open Conference)    (dark)    (light)    (alternate)Crispa Redmanizers (Reinforced All-Filipino Conference)   (dark)   (light)

Transactions
During the Reinforced Filipino Conference, the Crispa Redmanizers recruited and signed four players from the Multi-titled APCOR ballclub in the MICAA namely; Ramon Cruz, Arturo Cristobal, Padim Israel and Elpidio Villamin, a fifth recruit from the amateurs was Rudy Distrito.

With the Entry of former APCOR players, four players from Crispa who were part of the Open Conference lineup that lost to Toyota were dropped from the rosters; Virgilio Dela Cruz, Tito Varela, Jaime Javier and Gregorio Dionisio.

Summary
Byron "Snake" Jones is playing in his sixth PBA season and will be returning for the Redmanizers in the Open Conference after seeing action for Crispa in the short Invitational Championship last year. Jones' partner is 6-8 James Hardy, a first round pick of the New Orleans Jazz in the NBA. 

Crispa won their first game of the season on March 8 against rival Toyota Super Diesels, 112-97, spoiling the debut of new Toyota coach Ed Ocampo.  The Redmanizers placed second in the team standings with 13 wins and five losses, a game behind San Miguel Beermen and U-Tex Wranglers after 18 games in the elimination round. In the semifinals, Crispa and Toyota arranged a title showdown as they raced to a similar 4-1 won-loss slates as opposed to U-Tex and San Miguel's 1-4 card with still one scheduled game left in the semifinal round.

Crispa was a slight favorite to win the championship for having beaten the Super Diesels in three of their four previous meetings. The Redmanizers lost the first game of the series but scored back-to-back victories in Games two and three for a 2-1 lead and a win away from clinching the crown. Toyota came back to win the last two games of the best-of-five finals series and take home the Open Conference title.   

In the Reinforced Filipino Conference, the Redmanizers paraded 6-1 Allan Green as their import. Crispa were tied with Toyota at first place with seven wins and two losses after the one-round elimination phase and advances into the semifinals by posting a 3-2 won-loss card in the round of six. In the semifinal round, the Redmanizers had to win two of their last three matches in the second round to force a playoff with Presto Fun Drinks for the second finals berth and the right to play U-Tex, which booked the first finals seat. Crispa defeated Presto, 119-114 on November 17, to arrange a titular showdown with the Wranglers. The Redmanizers won their 9th PBA title with a 3-1 series victory over U-Tex.

Won-loss record vs Opponents

Open Conference roster

Reinforced All-Filipino Conference roster

Note: The four players released after the Open Conference upon the acquisition of five new recruits, may have played a couple of games in the Reinforced All-Filipino but were no longer part of the championship roster.

References

External links
Crispa team photo@interbasket.net

Crispa Redmanizers seasons
Crispa